Ty Christian Tice (born July 4, 1996) is an American professional baseball pitcher in the Atlanta Braves organization. He previously played in Major League Baseball (MLB) for the Toronto Blue Jays.

Career

Toronto Blue Jays
Tice attended Prairie Grove High School in Prairie Grove, Arkansas and played college baseball at the University of Central Arkansas. He was drafted by the Toronto Blue Jays in the 17th round of the 2017 MLB Draft. He made his professional debut in 2017 with the rookie ball Bluefield Blue Jays, recording a 1.05 ERA in 25.2 innings of work.

In 2018, Tice split the season between the Single-A Lansing Lugnuts and the High-A Dunedin Blue Jays, posting a 7-7 record and 2.29 ERA in 44 appearances between the teams. In 2019, he split the year between the Double-A New Hampshire Fisher Cats and the Triple-A Buffalo Bisons, pitching to a 3-4 record and 2.34 ERA on the year. Tice did not play in a game in 2020 due to the cancellation of the minor league season because of the COVID-19 pandemic.

The Blue Jays added Tice to their 40-man roster after the 2020 season. On April 9, 2021, Tice was promoted to the major leagues for the first time. He made his MLB debut that day against the Los Angeles Angels, throwing 2.0 shutout innings. Tice recorded a 5.14 ERA with 6 strikeouts across 4 games before being designated for assignment on May 30, 2021.

Atlanta Braves
On June 3, 2021, Tice was traded to the Atlanta Braves in exchange for cash considerations. Tice only made one appearance for Atlanta, pitching a scoreless inning, and struggled to a 7.36 ERA in 11 appearances with the Triple-A Gwinnett Stripers.

Arizona Diamondbacks
On July 21, 2021, Tice was claimed off waivers by the Arizona Diamondbacks. On August 5, Tice cleared waivers and was assigned outright to the Triple-A Reno Aces. He was released on July 20, 2022.

Atlanta Braves (second stint)
On January 4, 2023, Tice signed a minor league contract with the Atlanta Braves organization.

References

External links

1996 births
Living people
People from Prairie Grove, Arkansas
Baseball players from Arkansas
Major League Baseball pitchers
Toronto Blue Jays players
Atlanta Braves players
Central Arkansas Bears baseball players
Bluefield Blue Jays players
Lansing Lugnuts players
Dunedin Blue Jays players
New Hampshire Fisher Cats players
Buffalo Bisons (minor league) players
Gwinnett Stripers players
Reno Aces players